Ryan Airfield , also known as Ryan Field, is a city-owned, public-use airport located  southwest of the central business district of Tucson, a city in Pima County, Arizona, United States. It is included in the National Plan of Integrated Airport Systems for 2011–2015, which categorized it as a reliever airport. It is mostly used for general aviation but also serves a significant amount of law enforcement and military helicopter activity. Approximately 50% of Ryan's traffic is training-related.

Although most U.S. airports use the same three-letter location identifier for the FAA and IATA, this airport is assigned RYN by the FAA but has no designation from the IATA (which assigned RYN to Royan - Médis Airport in Royan, France). The airport's ICAO identifier is KRYN.

History
According to historian David Leighton, after the surprise attack by the Japanese on Pearl Harbor, Hawaii, in December 1941, the military decided that an inland training location was preferred, to the current Ryan School of Aeronautics in San Diego, California, founded by aviation pioneer T. Claude Ryan and Tucson was chosen as the site.

Ground was broken in June 1942 for the new Ryan School of Aeronautics of Arizona under the direction of the U.S. Army Air Forces, located about 15 miles southwest of Tucson, along the Ajo Highway. By August 1942, the institution with its half-completed buildings and roofless offices, was training aviators in the Ryan P-22 aircraft, which functioned surprisingly well in the heat, wind and dust storms, although crashes did occur at the school, at times, leading to death in certain incidents.

By July 1943, when T. Claude Ryan, the president of the school, returned the following year, Ryan Airfield had been completed. By this time the airfield had electricity, plumbing and air conditioning. The ground was covered with asphalt to hold the desert dust. It also had barracks and a PX.

Military flight training at Ryan ceased in 1944 and the property was conveyed to the State of Arizona in 1948. Currently owned by the City of Tucson, Ryan is operated by the Tucson Airport Authority under an agreement which expires in 2054.

An air traffic control tower was constructed at Ryan in 1993. The airport was added to the Contract Tower Program in 1996. In September 2004, the tower staff completed the one millionth operation without an error.  In May 2010, the tower staff achieved two million operations without an error.

Significant infrastructure improvements and major maintenance projects are accomplished continuously, as is private and commercial hangar construction.

Facilities and aircraft 
It has three runways with asphalt surfaces:

Only runway 6R is serviced by an instrument approach. It allows pilots to land with ceilings as low as 250 feet above ground level. Runways 6L and 6R are the preferential runways, and they are used with tailwinds up to 10 knots.

For the 12-month period ending March 31, 2009, the airport had 159,806 aircraft operations, an average of 437 per day: 97% general aviation and 3% military. At that time there were 192 aircraft based at this airport: 91.7% single-engine, 5.7% multi-engine, 2.1% helicopter, and 1.6% helicopter.

See also

 Arizona World War II Army Airfields
 37th Flying Training Wing (World War II)
 List of airports in Arizona

References

Other sources
 
 Manning, Thomas A. (2005), History of Air Education and Training Command, 1942–2002. Office of History and Research, Headquarters, AETC, Randolph AFB, Texas  
 Shaw, Frederick J. (2004), Locating Air Force Base Sites, History’s Legacy, Air Force History and Museums Program, United States Air Force, Washington DC.

External links
 Ryan Airfield, official website
 Aerial image as of May 1992 from USGS The National Map
 
 
 
 Flight training at Ryan Airfield
 Alpha Air
 Kelly's Aviation

Airports in Pima County, Arizona
USAAF Contract Flying School Airfields
Airfields of the United States Army Air Forces in Arizona
USAAF Western Flying Training Command
American Theater of World War II
1942 establishments in Arizona